The Beijing High People's Court, officially called High People's Court of Beijing Municipality, is the high people's court for Beijing, China.

Area of authority 
The Beijing High People's Court has authority over Beijing municipality, as well as the Beijing Railway Bureau.

Structure

Judicial organs

Other organs

Presidents 
 Chi Qiang (January 2008 to January 2013)
 Ge Ping (January 2013 to January 2016)
 Yang Wanming (January 2016 to present)

External links 
 Beijing Courts website

Judiciary of China
Politics of Beijing